Ancylodactylus petrodroma, also known as the Nigeria crag gecko or Ondo forest gecko,  is a species of gecko endemic to Nigeria.

References

Endemic fauna of Nigeria
Ancylodactylus
Reptiles described in 1986